Pristava (in Slovenian originally) is a detached economic (farming) unit of an estate or manor, It may refer to:

Slovenia
Cvetkovci, a village in the Municipality of Ormož, formerly known as Pristava
Mala Pristava, Pivka, a settlement in the Municipality of Pivka
Pristava, Borovnica, a settlement in the Municipality of Borovnica
Pristava, Cirkulane, a settlement in the Municipality of Cirkulane
Pristava, Ljutomer, a settlement in the Municipality of Ljutomer
Pristava nad Stično, a settlement in the Municipality of Ivančna Gorica
Pristava, Nova Gorica (also known as Rafut), one of the four suburbs of the town of Nova Gorica in the Gorizia region of western Slovenia
Pristava, Novo Mesto, a village in southeastern Slovenia, in the Municipality of Novo Mesto
Pristava ob Krki, a settlement in the Municipality of Krško
Pristava pri Lesičnem, a settlement in the Municipality of Podčetrtek
Pristava pri Leskovcu, a settlement in the Municipality of Krško
Pristava pri Mestinju, a settlement in the Municipality of Podčetrtek
Pristava, Sežana, a settlement in the Municipality of Sežana
Pristava, Tržič, a settlement in the Municipality of Tržič
Spodnja Pristava, a settlement in the Municipality of Slovenske Konjice
Velika Pristava, a settlement in the Municipality of Pivka
Zgornja Pristava, Slovenske Konjice, a settlement in the Municipality of Slovenske Konjice
Zgornja Pristava, Videm, a settlement in the Municipality of Videm
Pristava House, a manor house near Jesenice

Croatia
 Pristava, Croatia, a village